Pameridea roridulae is a species of jumping tree bug in the family Miridae. It has a symbiotic relationship with Roridula, where it feeds on trapped insects and its excretions are absorbed through the leaves of the Roridula, giving the plant much needed nutrients and nitrogen. Juvenile P. roridulae also pollinate the plant.

References

Further reading

 

Miridae
Articles created by Qbugbot
Insects described in 1907